Istro-Romanian grammar expresses the structure of the Istro-Romanian language It is similar to those of other Eastern Romance languages.

Morphology 
Istro-Romanian is thought to have evolved from Daco-Romanian (which instead may have evolved independently). The evolution shows two distinct features. Noun declension shows a rationalisation of forms: normal noun declension almost totally disappeared in Istro-Romanian, whereas verbal inflexion is more conservative and its evolution is not as pronounced.

Grammar

Articles 
Articles have two forms: definite and indefinite. The definite article may be nominal or adjectival, the nominal being added to nouns, and the adjectival placed before adjectives.

The nominal forms are: for masculine nouns: -l and -le, for feminine -a in the singular, and for masculine -i and feminine -le in the plural. As in spoken Daco-Romanian, the -l of the masculine singular definite article is dropped, leaving the linking -u- vowel, e.g. DR lupul > IR lupu (the wolf), DR ursul > IR ursu (the bear), DR mielul > IR mľelu (the lamb).

The -le ending is used for all masculine singular nouns ending in -e, e.g. fråtele (the brother), sorele (the sun), cărele (the dog). Some examples of masculine nouns showing case endings, nominative=accusative, genitive=dative. The vocative case is not shown as this normally corresponds with the nominative.

 fiľ (son), fiľi (pl.)

 socru (father-in-law), socri (pl.)

 fråte (brother), fråţ (pl.)

The -a replaces -ĕ and -e, e.g. cåsĕ > cåsa (the house), nopte > nopta (the night); however a few feminine nouns ending in a stressed -e behave differently, e.g. ste > stevu (the star), ne > nevu (the snow).

 fetĕ (girl), fete (pl.)

 muľerĕ (woman), muľere (pl.)

 ste (star), stele (pl.)

Neuter nouns behave as masculine nouns in the singular and feminine in the plural.
 bråţ (arm), bråţe (pl.) – bråţu (the arm), bråţele (pl.)
 os (bone), ose (pl.) – osu (the bone), osele (pl.)
 zid (wall), zidur (pl.) – zidu (the wall), zidurle (pl.)
 plug (plough), plugur (pl.) – plugu (the plough), plugurle (pl.)

The forms of the adjectival article are ćela for the masculine and ćå for the feminine singular, and in the plural masculine ćeľ and feminine ćåle, e.g. ćela bur (the good one). The masculine indefinite article is un and feminine is o. The declension of the indefinite article has disappeared. Examples: un om (a man), un cå (a horse), o misĕ (a table), o båbĕ (an old woman).

Adjectives 
Adjectives also have three genders, the masculine and feminine forms from the Latin, while the neuter form is of Slavic origin. E.g. bur, burĕ, buro (good). The comparative adjective is måi bur (better) and the superlative is ćel måi bur (the best).

The adjective may precede the noun: bura zi ((the) good day), which in itself can be made definite by the change of -ĕ to -a; or follows the noun: feta muşåtĕ (the beautiful girl).

Pronouns 
Definite pronouns can be personal, possessive, demonstrative, relative and interrogative.

References 
 A. Kovačec: Notes sur les formes de cas en istroroumain. Studia Romanica 13–14: 75–84, Zagreb 1962
 A. Kovačec: Certaines modifications grammaticales des 'quantitatifs' et 'qualitatifs' istroroumains dues a l' influence croate. Studia Romanica 23: 195–210, Zagreb 1967
 A. Kovačec: Le calque lexical d' apres le croate comme cause de certains changements grammaticaux istroroumains. Actele de XII Congres International de Lingvistica si Filologie Romanica, vol. 2: 1127–1131, Bucuresti 1971
 A. Kovačec: Istrorumunjsko-hrvatski rječnik s gramatikom i tekstovima (Glosar Istroroman-Croat cu gramatica si texte). Verba moritura vol. I. Mediteran, Pula 1998

External links 

 The Istro-romanians in Croatia – Alphabet
 UNESCO Red Book on Endangered Languages – entry for Istro-Romanian
 Istro-Romanian Community Worldwide

Grammar
Italic grammars